Cyanarctia percurrens is a moth of the subfamily Arctiinae. It was described by Warren in 1905. It is found in Peru.

References

Arctiini
Moths described in 1905